The Trypetheliaceae are a family of mainly lichen-forming fungi in the order Trypetheliales.

Genera
Alloarthopyrenia  – 1 sp.
Aptrootia  – 3 spp.
Architrypethelium  – 8 spp.
Astrothelium  – ca. 275 spp.
Bathelium  – 16 spp.
Bogoriella  – 29 spp.
Buscalionia  – 1 sp.
Constrictolumina  – 9 spp.
Dictyomeridium  – 7 spp.
Distothelia  – 3 spp.
Laurera  – 2 spp.
Macroconstrictolumina  – 4 spp.
Marcelaria  – 3 spp.
Musaespora  – 2 spp.
Mycomicrothelia  – 8 spp.
Nigrovothelium  – 3 spp.
Novomicrothelia  – 1 sp.
Polymeridium  – 51 spp.
Polypyrenula  – 1 sp.
Pseudopyrenula  – 21 spp.
Trypethelium  – 16 spp.
Viridothelium  – 11 spp.

References

 
Dothideomycetes families
Lichen families
Taxa described in 1827
Taxa named by Jonathan Carl Zenker